Hudson City School District is a school district in Hudson, New York, U.S.A.

It operates the following schools:
 Hudson High School
 Hudson Junior High School
 Montgomery C. Smith Elementary School
 John L. Edwards Primary School (building closed)
 Greenport Elementary School (building closed and for sale)
 Alternative Learning Program (closed due to budget cuts and closure of Greenport)

External links
Hudson City School District

School districts in New York (state)
Education in Columbia County, New York